Turgenevo is an urban locality (a work settlement) in Ardatovsky District of the Republic of Mordovia, Russia. As of the 2010 Census, its population was 5,260.

History
Urban-type settlement status was granted to it in 1960.

Administrative and municipal status
Within the framework of administrative divisions, the work settlement of Turgenevo, together with one rural locality (the settlement of Svetotekhnika), is incorporated within Ardatovsky District as Turgenevo Work Settlement (an administrative division of the district). As a municipal division, Turgenevo Work Settlement is incorporated within Ardatovsky Municipal District as Turgenevskoye Urban Settlement.

References

Notes

Sources

Urban-type settlements in Mordovia
Ardatovsky District, Republic of Mordovia
Ardatovsky Uyezd (Simbirsk Governorate)